Edward John King (July 1, 1867 – February 17, 1929) was a U.S. Representative from Illinois.

Born in Springfield, Massachusetts, King moved to Illinois with his parents, who settled in Galesburg, Knox County, in 1880. He attended the public schools, and Knox College at Galesburg, Illinois. He studied law. He was admitted to the bar in 1893 and commenced practice in Galesburg, Illinois. He was city attorney in 1893 and 1894. He served as member of the State house of representatives 1907-1914.

King was elected as a Republican to the Sixty-fourth and to the six succeeding Congresses and served from March 4, 1915, until his death. On April 5, 1917, he, with 49 other Representatives, voted against declaring war on Germany. He served as chairman of the Committee on Expenditures in the Department of Agriculture (Sixty-seventh through Sixty-ninth Congresses). He had been reelected to the Seventy-first Congress, but died in office in Washington, D.C., February 17, 1929.
He was interred in Hope Abbey Mausoleum, Hope Cemetery, Galesburg, Illinois.

See also
List of United States Congress members who died in office (1900–49)

References

1867 births
1929 deaths
Republican Party members of the United States House of Representatives from Illinois
Republican Party members of the Illinois House of Representatives